Martín Cárdenas Ochoa (born 28 January 1982) is a Colombian professional motorcycle road racer.

Career statistics

All-time statistics

Grand Prix motorcycle racing

By season

By class

Races by year
(key) (Races in bold indicate pole position) (Races in italics indicate fastest lap)

Supersport World Championship

Races by year
(key) (Races in bold indicate pole position) (Races in italics indicate fastest lap)

References 

1982 births
Living people
Sportspeople from Medellín
Colombian motorcycle racers
AMA Superbike Championship riders
Moto2 World Championship riders
Supersport World Championship riders
250cc World Championship riders
21st-century Colombian people